Mattis Stenshagen (born 13 August 1996) is a Norwegian cross-country skier.

At the 2015 Junior World Championships he finished eighth at best, but in 2016 he won a gold medal in relay and the silver medal in the 15 km race. At the 2018 Junior World Championships, now in the U23 age class, he won the gold medal in the 15 km.

He made his World Cup debut in December 2016 in Lillehammer, collecting his first World Cup points on the next day with a 24th-place finish in the 10 km race. He broke the top 10 for the first time in January 2018 in Planica, finishing seventh in the 15 km. In January 2019 in Otepää he improved further, to fifth in sprint and eight in 15 km.

He represents the sports club Follebu SK.

Cross-country skiing results
All results are sourced from the International Ski Federation (FIS).

World Cup

Season standings

References 

1996 births
Living people
People from Gausdal
Norwegian male cross-country skiers
Sportspeople from Innlandet